The margined snake eel (Ophichthus cruentifer) is a snake eel in the genus Ophichthus. It is found in the coastal waters of the western North Atlantic.

Description
Ophichthus cruentifer grows to  total length.

The following description is from Bigelow and Schroeder's Fishes of the Gulf of Maine:
The most striking feature of this fish and one that distinguishes it from all other Gulf of Maine eels is that the tip of its tail is hard and pointed. Other distinctive features are that it is only about one thirty-seventh to one thirty-eighth as deep as it is long; that its dorsal fin originates only a short distance behind the tips of the pectoral fins when these are laid back; that its anal fin originates far behind its dorsal fin; that its snout is bluntly pointed; and that its mouth gapes rearward considerably beyond its eyes (but not so far back as in the long-nosed eel). The dorsal and anal fins end a little in front of the tip of the tail. The gill openings are short new-moon-shaped slits, close in front of the bases of the pectoral fins. Its "peculiar and savage physiognomy" was stressed by its describers.

It was originally described as brownish yellow uniformly. However, those that have been sighted have been light brown uniformly, with large snake eels being darker than small ones. A young specimen about 2½ inches (6½ cm) long was pale with dark speckles.

References

margined snake eel
Fish of the Western Atlantic
Fish of the Eastern United States
margined snake eel
margined snake eel
margined snake eel